The Sprout Sharing Show was a programming block on the Sprout cable channel. The show premiered on May 5, 2008, airing on daily afternoons (3PM-6PM EST) in the lineup formerly occupied by The Let's Go Show , however, The Let's Go Show moved to a weekend lineup until September 2010. It features three new programs which encourage viewers (referred to on the channel as "Sproutlets") to send in photos, videos, artwork, and stories. Programs and segments are introduced by the show's puppet hosts: Patty (a pig voiced by Kelly Vrooman), Ricky (a rabbit voiced by Kevin Yamada), and Curtis E. Owl (voiced by Sean Roach), whose first name and middle initial are a pun on the word "courtesy". Other characters include Patty's mother, Ricky's father and Curtis' younger brother, Otis, who plays the ukulele. It ended on May 11, 2014.

Characters
Patty / Voiced by Kelly Vrooman
Ricky / Voiced by Kevin Yamada
Ricky's Dad / Voiced by Forest Harding
Curtis E. Owl / Voiced by Sean Roach / Performed by Brendan Gawell
Patty's Mom / Voiced by Forest Harding
Otis / Voiced by Forest Harding
Stage Mice

Original programming
In Pic Me, a co-production with Nickelodeon UK, head-shot photos of children are superimposed on animated bodies, and these new hybrid animations are used as main characters in animated stories. Other segments include viewer-submitted videos, and a feature where drawings sent in by viewers are animated and made into stories themselves.

Acquired programming
 Super Why!
 Franny's Feet
 Angelina Ballerina
 Mama Mirabelle's Home Movies
 Bob the Builder
 Dragon Tales
 Fifi and the Flowertots 
 Dirtgirlworld
 The Mighty Jungle
 Monkey See Monkey Do 
 Zoboomafoo
 Thomas & Friends 
 The Hoobs
 Make Way for Noddy
 Pingu
 The Wiggles
 George Shrinks
 Rainbow Fish
 Chloe's Closet
 The Chica Show
 Fireman Sam 
 Pic Me 
 Olive the Ostrich

References

External links
 AWN Article

Television programming blocks in the United States
American television shows featuring puppetry

Universal Kids original programming